Belinda Bauer (born Belinda Sylvia Taubman; 13 June 1950) is a retired Australian actress and working psychologist whose film career spanned the 1980s and 1990s. She lives in Los Angeles, California.

Biography
Belinda Bauer's great grandfather, Nathaniel James Taubman, grandson of John Taubman started Taubman Paints, a paint manufacturing company, in the late 1890s with his brother George Henry Taubman. Belinda's maternal family owned Ritchie Brothers Steel, making trains and farm equipment. Her uncle was Donald Robinson the Anglican Archbishop of Sydney from 1982 to 1992. 
Belinda grew up in Pymble in Sydney and attended Abbotsleigh. Starting her career as a ballet dancer, TV actress and model, she competed as Belinda Taubman in several beauty contests in Sydney, Australia, winning Miss Queen of the Pacific, in 1968. Belinda Taubman relocated to New York in the early 1970s, and changed her name to Bauer. Belinda Bauer worked in New York as a model as the face of Revlon and appearing in fashion magazines. She became popular in several American cult films of the late 1970s and 1980s, including Winter Kills, The American Success Company, Timerider: The Adventure of Lyle Swann and Flashdance. Between television work, she also appeared in the films The Rosary Murders and RoboCop 2.

Bauer's main title roles were in the television films The Sins of Dorian Gray (1983) (a rendition of the Oscar Wilde novel The Picture of Dorian Gray); a live-action Rankin/Bass production called Starcrossed (1985), in which she played an alien woman living on Earth; and as Christine Scavello in the supernatural thriller Dean R. Koontz's Servants of Twilight (1991). She also appeared in the pilot of the television series Airwolf (1984) as Gabrielle Ademaur, a love interest for Stringfellow Hawke (Jan-Michael Vincent). Her last credited appearance was in the erotic thriller Poison Ivy II: Lily (1996).

She often portrayed strong female characters, including Delilah in the film Samson and Delilah (1984)

She presently resides in Los Angeles, California, where she works as a psychologist.

Selected filmography

References

External links
 Belinda Bauer Spiritual Psychology and Consulting
 
 

1950 births
Living people
20th-century Australian actresses
Actresses from New South Wales
Australian film actresses
Australian television actresses